The Parangana Power Station is a mini-hydro power station located in north-western Tasmania, Australia. It is located below the rock-filled/clay core Parangana Dam which forms Lake Parangana. It is the only mini hydro electric power station in the MerseyForth run-of-river scheme that also contains seven conventional hydroelectric power stations.

The power station was commissioned in 2002 by Hydro Tasmania.

Much of the water from Lake Parangana travels the approximately 8 km to the Lemonthyme Power Station which discharges into the River Forth, however some water is allowed to continue down the Mersey River for environmental reasons, after running through the Parangana mini hydro station.

See also

 List of power stations in Tasmania

References

Energy infrastructure completed in 2002
Hydroelectric power stations in Tasmania
Localities of Meander Valley Council
Mersey River (Tasmania)